Wilbarger may refer to:

 Wilbarger County, Texas
 Josiah P. Wilbarger (1801–1845), early Texan settler